Mickey's Mechanical Man is a 1933 animated short cartoon created by Walt Disney. It was the 57th Mickey Mouse short film, and the seventh of that year.

Plot
Mickey finds out about a new boxing match involving "Kongo the Killer". So what Mickey does is construct a mechanical man, and teaches it how to box while playing piano. Minnie Mouse then comes and honks her car horn, causing the mechanical man to run into a frenzy. The match then begins, and the mechanical man, however, is losing, once felt dazed by Kongo. Kongo is hitting his neck, causing his head to aim toward the ceiling. This continues, until Minnie uses her horn like she did earlier, causing the metal man becomes angry and knocks Kongo to the ground.  The Mechanical man is seen beating up Kongo, and Mickey and the other fans happily clap, and Mickey and Minnie kiss successfully as the cartoon ends.

Voice cast
 Mickey Mouse: Walt Disney
 Minnie Mouse: Marcellite Garner
 Robot: unknown
 Kongo Killer the Gorilla: unknown

Home media
The short was released on December 7, 2004, on Walt Disney Treasures: Mickey Mouse in Black and White, Volume Two: 1929-1935.

Video game
The cartoon is featured in the 2010 game Epic Mickey as a 2-part projector screen level, which connects parts of "Tomorrow City", which is based on Disneyland's Tomorrowland. Also a minigame based on the short appears in the 2019 video game Kingdom Hearts III, where the player controls the robot's movements to defeat the gorilla.

References

1933 films
1933 animated films
1933 comedy films
1930s science fiction films
1930s Disney animated short films
Films directed by Wilfred Jackson
Films produced by Walt Disney
Mickey Mouse short films
American black-and-white films
American robot films
Animated films about robots
Films scored by Leigh Harline
1930s English-language films
1930s American films